Boss Fight Entertainment is an American video game development company based in Allen, Texas, with a second studio based in Austin, Texas. Boss Fight was formed by former Zynga Dallas and Ensemble Studios employees in June 2013.

History
Boss Fight Entertainment was founded by David Rippy, Scott Winsett, and Bill Jackson following the closure of Zynga Dallas in June 2013.

In September 2014, Boss Fight announced that they were working on a game called Dungeon Boss. Big Fish Games was announced as Dungeon Boss's publisher in March 2014.

In May 2015, former Amazon Game Studios director Dave Luehmann joined Boss Fight Entertainment as VP of Production. Boss Fight opened an office in Austin, Texas in July 2015.

In March 2022, the studio was acquired by Netflix as part of Netflix's venture into video game offerings.

Games

Office

Boss Fight's McKinney office was initially located at the newly renovated Cotton Mill, which is listed in the National Register of Historic Places listings in Collin County, Texas. Their new headquarters in located in Allen, just north of the Watters Shopping district.

Boss Fight's Austin office is located in the Northwest part of Austin, in an area known as the high-tech corridor.

References

External links
 Dungeon Boss
 YouTube: Dungeon Boss Trailer
 Boss Fight Entertainment's web site

American companies established in 2013
Video game companies of the United States
Video game development companies
Video game companies established in 2013
Companies based in Allen, Texas
2013 establishments in Texas
Netflix
2022 mergers and acquisitions
American corporate subsidiaries
Mobile game companies